The Ohio State Buckeyes women's ice hockey program represented the Ohio State University during the 2016-17 NCAA Division I women's ice hockey season.

Recruiting

Roster

2016–17 Buckeyes

2016-17 schedule

|-
!colspan=12 style=""| Regular Season

|-
!colspan=12 style=""| WCHA Tournament

Awards and honors

Jincy Dunne - WCHA Rookie of the Month
Kassidy Sauve, goaltender - WCHA Second Team All-Star
Jincy Dunne, defense - WCHA Third Team All-Star
Jincy Dunne, defense - WCHA All-Rookie Team
Kassidy Sauve, goaltender - AHCA Second Team All-American

References

Ohio State
Ohio State Buckeyes women's ice hockey seasons
Ohio State
Ohio State
Ohio State